Events in the year 2020 in Uzbekistan.

Incumbents

 President: Shavkat Mirziyoyev
 Prime Minister: Abdulla Aripov
 Chairman of the Senate: Tanzila Norbaeva
 Speaker of the Legislative Chamber: Nurdinjon Ismoilov

Events

January
January 5 – 2nd round of the 2019–20 Uzbek parliamentary election.

March

 March 15 – The first COVID-19 case in the country is confirmed, resulting in kindergartens, schools, and borders being closed.

 Since March 16 – Uzbekistan have been banned from gathering mass events gather with the participation  of more than 10,000 participants.

March 22 – The country ordered companies in Tashkent to do remote working, as well as making protective masks mandatory.
March 27 – The first COVID-19 death was reported in the country.

Deaths

March

 March 9 – Azim Suyun, poet (b. 1948).

See also

Country overviews
 Uzbekistan
 History of Uzbekistan
 Outline of Uzbekistan
 Government of Uzbekistan
 Politics of Uzbekistan
 List of years in Uzbekistan

Related timelines for current period
 2020
 2020 in politics and government
 2020s

References

 
2010s in Uzbekistan
Years of the 21st century in Uzbekistan
Uzbekistan
Uzbekistan